XHD-FM and XHZG-FM are radio stations on 96.5 FM and 94.9 FM in Ixmiquilpan, Hidalgo, part of the Radio y Televisión de Hidalgo state radio network.

History
On March 27, 1963, the public agency Patrimonio Indígena del Valle de Mezquital signed on its first radio station, XHD-FM, with a formal inauguration by President Adolfo López Mateos. Operating then as now on 96.5 MHz, XHD was Hidalgo's first FM radio station (and the first radio station to operate in Ixmiquilpan); it also was the first radio school program in Mexico, broadcasting programming for the Mezquital Otomí population.

In 1975, XEZG-AM was permitted. XEZG offered programming targeted at a rural audience, while XHD sought to serve a more urban population. 1982 saw PIVM's radio holdings expand even further, with new AM stations at Tlachinol and Huejutla de Reyes (also now part of RTH). The name of the organization had changed to Patrimonio Indígena del Valle de Mezquital y la Huasteca Hidalguense (PIVMHH), and the station was known as Radio Mezquital y Huasteca Hidalguense.
On January 8, 1991, PIVMHH was liquidated. The radio stations were absorbed by the state government in 1995.

XEZG was cleared to migrate to FM in 2012 as XHZG-FM 94.9, though it would be years before it came into operation. XHZG and XHD simulcast, with 94.9 being receivable in Ixmiquilpan proper and 96.5 in the surrounding rural area.

References

Spanish-language radio stations
Radio stations in Hidalgo (state)
Public radio in Mexico